Aviya Kopelman (born in Moscow 1978) is an Israeli composer and pianist.

She is one of the youngest ever Israel Prime Minister Prize for Composition recipients and serves since 2013 as composer-in-residence of the Jerusalem Symphony Orchestra.

Kopelman's musical education started with piano lessons and she is listed as a "notable alumna of Israel Arts and Science Academy", where she studied with prof. Andre Hajdu, prof. Bat-Sheva Rubinstein and prof. Michael Wolpe. She holds degrees in composition from Jerusalem Music and Dance Academy, Bar-Ilan University (MA Summa Cum Laude, PhD in progress). She was a lecturer in Hed College of Music in 2003–2007 and a senior lecturer, as well as academic advisor and master-classes curator in Rimon School of Music in 2006–2014. She gives lectures and courses in major academic institutions in Israel, including Jerusalem Music and Dance Academy, Buchmann-Mehta School of Tel Aviv University, Haifa University, Levinsky College, Musrara College, Bar-Ilan University Music Department, Van Leer Institute, and more.

As a Composer-in-Residence of the Jerusalem Symphony Kopelman enlarged (at least doubled) and significantly widened the Israeli music repertoire performed by the orchestra, allowing many young composers as well as to female composers to be performed by a professional symphony orchestra for their first time.

In 2019-2020 she was a recipient of two prestigious residencies: one was at Magnes Museum of the University of California, Berkeley and the Israel Institute. The other one was six months residency in Cite Internationale des Arts, Paris.

Selected concert works 
Kopelman's concert music includes a commissioned work  "Widows & Lovers" for the Kronos Quartet, as forth recipient of the "Kronos: Under 30” project, where she was competing with over 200 composers from all over the world. The piece was widely performed and later workshopped by Kronos after the premiere at the Carnegie Hall, by ensembles such as the Ragazze Quartet and young Israeli musicians. The third movement of the piece, "Black Widow," is often performed as an independent piece, and was arranged and performed by the Swedish string orchestra Kvinnoorkestern.

Kopelman's instrumental concert music includes works written for and performed by the Arthur Rubinstein International Piano Competition, the Cremona Quartet, Jerusalem Trio, Conjunto Iberico Octet, the Israel Camerata, Israeli Chamber Orchestra, Raanana Symphonette, the Israel Sinfonietta Beer Sheva, Carmel Quartet, the Jerusalem Symphony Orchestra, Waterloo Soloists, Gavriel Lipkind, Noam Buchman, Eyal Shiloach, and many more.

Her vocal concert music is set primarily to Hebrew and Russian poetry, often combining different languages in one piece. An early example includes the song cycle "Songs of Love and Distress" for voice and piano/string quartet, combining Akhmatova's, Wallach's, Avidan's and Kopelman's texts in poly-stylistic and painful piece. Another large work is the Hebrew Magnificat for SATB choir and orchestra, originally performed in 2005 by the Tel-Aviv Chamber Choir, and later edited and re-orchestrated for symphonic orchestra (2017, JSO). The piece, 37 minutes long, is set to Latin, German and Hebrew texts and deals with various aspects of maternity as it appears in the eyes of the 21st century.

Later writing is less European concert-music oriented and includes elements from popular music, especially in the rhythmic aspect. Examples include "Grief Measure," commissioned by the Carnegie Hall for Professional Training Workshop with  Dawn Upshaw, that includes besides voice also drums, bass, and electronics, "Sooner and Later" (2019) for soprano, string orchestra, percussion and drums is set on Leah Goldberg's poems, and was commissioned by the Israel Chamber Orchestra marking 50 years since Goldberg's passing, "Belong Not" for girls choir and handbells was co-commissioned by San Francisco Girls Chorus and the Israel Institute, and is set on Kopelman's arrangement of Khalil Gibran's poem "On Children." The piece was premiered in a special cooperation event of San Francisco Girls Chorus and Berkeley Ballet Theatre, for the centennial of the 19th Amendment to the United States constitution in Yerba Buena Arts Center, SF. The piece was choreographed by Chuck Wilt and Robert Dekkers.

Symphonic pieces include "May They Rest in Peace" (2002), "Between Gaza and Berlin" (2014), and "Ode to Jerusalem" (2019), all dealing with or referring to the complex political situation in Israel. The title of the second deterred both the IPO (according to Zubin Mehta) and the Israeli Opera from performing it in Israel.

Additional orchestral works include Concerto for Flute (2017) for symphony orchestra and "Kan Ya Ma Kan - Once Upon a Time" (2004) - a concerto for oud, violin and string orchestra.

Non-concert music 
Except for concert music, Kopelman is a songwriter, an album of which, is expected to be released in 2020. Another notable project was forming the Jazz Fusion ensemble named Turquoise Project (brass and rhythm section), for which she wrote and performed a full show program; part of it was studio recorded. In many of her concert music pieces too, she blurs the common division of concert and non-concert medium by using contemporary rock and pop melodies, harmonies, rhythm and instrumentation, and also cooperates with non-classical musicians such as Yair Dalal and Sameer Makhoul on oud, the Rock-Blues singer Ruth Dolores Weiss, the experimental guitarist Yonatan Albalak, electronic music artist Sacha Terrat, Jazz flutist Ilan Salem, and more. Kopelman wrote as well experimental music for violin and Max/MSP.

External links 
 Aviya Kopelman's Personal Web Site

References

1978 births
Living people
Israeli composers
Israeli pianists
Israeli women pianists
21st-century classical composers
Women classical composers
Women classical pianists
21st-century classical pianists
Academic staff of Ono Academic College
21st-century women composers
21st-century women pianists